Merciless is a Swedish extreme metal band.

History
The band was formed during the summer of 1986 in Strängnäs, Sweden by Erik Wallin (guitar), Fredrik Karlén (bass guitar) and Stefan Carlsson (drums). They were inspired by the early fast-playing bands such as Kreator, Sodom, Destruction and Bathory. First they did some local gigs as "Obsessed" and "Black Mass" but changed their name to Merciless in early 1987. A demo was recorded titled Behind the Black Door, which led to the replacement of Kåle by Rogga in early 1988. With this line-up they recorded a second demo Realm of the Dark in June 1988. This demo drew the attention of Deathlike Silence Productions - the label of Euronymous. That label released their debut album The Awakening in March 1990.

Their second album The Treasures Within was recorded in June and July 1991 but it was not released until a year later due to the mismanagement of their new label Active Records. This delay cause the departure of drummer Stipen who was replaced by Peter Stjärnvind in February 1992. In September 1993, after Scandinavian tour, they recorded their third album with Dan Swanö at the Unisound studios and was released by No Fashion Records. In 1994, the band broke up because of disillusionment with record labels, but got back together in 1995 to record the song "Crionics" for the Slayer tribute album, Slatanic Slaughter. In 1999, their debut album was re-issued by Osmose Productions, which eventually led to the reinstallment of the band. In May 2002, they entered the studio to record the successor to their 1994 album, simply named Merciless.

Discography
 Behind the Black Door (demo, 1987)
 Realm of the Dark (demo, 1988)
 The Awakening (1990)
 The Treasures Within (1992)
 Unbound (1994)
 Merciless (2003)

Members

Current members
 Roger "Rogga" Pettersson – vocals (1988–present)
 Erik Wallin – guitars (1986–present)
 Peter Stjärnvind – drums (1992–2004), guitars (2016–present)
 Stefan "Stipen" Carlsson – drums (1986–1992, 2004–present)

Former members 
 Kalle "Kåle" Aurenius – vocals (1986–1988, died 2017)
 Fredrik Karlén – bass (1986–2016)

References

Sources

Swedish death metal musical groups
Swedish thrash metal musical groups
Musical groups established in 1986
1986 establishments in Sweden